Jackie Dougan (1930, Greenock, Scotland – 27 January 1973, New South Wales, Australia) was a British jazz drummer.

A member of Tommy Whittle's and Eddie Thompson's groups in the 1950s, he joined the Dick Morrissey Quartet in the early 1960s. He joined the Ronnie Scott Quartet, along with another early Dick Morrissey Quartet member, Malcolm Cecil.

Following his stint with Scott, he joined the Tony Coe Quintet and later recorded with Stan Tracey (on the Jazz Suite Inspired by Dylan Thomas's "Under Milk Wood" album, 1965), Sonny Stitt, Ben Webster, Al Cohn and Zoot Sims.

Discography 
1962: Zoot at Ronnie Scott's – Zoot Sims
1962: Solo for Zoot – Zoot Sims
1963: Have You Heard? – The Dick Morrissey Quartet
1965: Jazz Suite Inspired by Dylan Thomas's "Under Milk Wood" – Stan Tracey
1965: Al and Zoot in London – Al Cohn & Zoot Sims

References 

1930 births
1973 deaths
British jazz drummers
20th-century British musicians
20th-century drummers